Koree Britton (born 4 March 1992)  is an English professional rugby union player who plays for London Welsh. On 2 April 2013, it was announced that Britton had signed a two-year contract extension to keep him at Gloucester until the end of the 2014–15 season. However, Britton left Gloucester as he signed for newly promoted side London Welsh from the 2014–15 season.

References

Living people
1992 births
English rugby union players
Gloucester Rugby players
Rugby union players from Torquay
Rugby union hookers